The 43rd Guillermo Mendoza Memorial Scholarship Foundation Box Office Entertainment Awards (GMMSF-BOEA) is a part of the annual awards in the Philippines held on April 29, 2012. The award-giving body honors Filipino actors, actresses and other performers' commercial success, regardless of artistic merit, in the Philippine entertainment industry.

Winners selection
On April 14, the Guillermo Mendoza Memorial Scholarship Foundation board of jurors met in the Danes Publishing House, Mindanao Avenue in Quezon City and deliberated for this year's winners. They added two new categories: the "Phenomenal Box Office Star" which will be first received by Vice Ganda for his film The Unkabogable Praybeyt Benjamin; and the "Box Office Tandem" to Vic Sotto and Ai Ai delas Alas for collaborating in Enteng Ng Ina Mo film. The former received the highest box office returns in 2011, with P332 million gross, while the latter received the highest gross during the 2011 Metro Manila Film Festival, with P237.88 gross from December 25 to January 7.

The winners were chosen from the Top 10 Philippine films of 2011, top-rating shows in Philippine television, top recording awards received by singers, and top gross receipts of concerts and performances.

Award ceremony

On April 29, 2012 at RCBC Plaza in Makati, Philippines, the 43rd Box Office Entertainment Awards night was held, produced by the Airtime Marketing of Tessie Celestino. The event will, then, be aired on May 6 at Sunday's Best on ABS-CBN.

Awards

Major awards
Phenomenal Box Office Star - Vice Ganda (The Unkabogable Praybeyt Benjamin)
Box Office King - Derek Ramsay (No Other Woman)
Box Office Queens - Anne Curtis and Cristine Reyes (No Other Woman)
Box Office Tandem - Vic Sotto and Ai Ai delas Alas (Enteng Ng Ina Mo)
Male Concert Performer of the Year - Vice Ganda
Female Concert Performer of the Year - Toni Gonzaga
Male Recording Artist of the Year - Christian Bautista
Female Recording Artist of the Year - Angeline Quinto

Film category
Film Actor of the Year - Aga Muhlach (In the Name of Love)
Film Actress of the Year - Angel Locsin (In the Name of Love)
Prince of Philippine Movies - Gerald Anderson (Catch Me, I'm in Love)
Princess of Philippine Movies - Sarah Geronimo (Catch Me, I'm in Love)
Most Promising Male Star of the Year - Rocco Nacino 
Most Promising Female Star of the Year - Solenn Heussaff
Most Popular Film Producers - Star Cinema and Viva Films
Most Popular Film Director - Wenn Deramas (The Unkabogable Praybeyt Benjamin)
Most Popular Screenwriter - Wenn Deramas and Keiko Aquino (The Unkabogable Praybeyt Benjamin)

Music category
Promising Male Singer/Performer - Elmo Magalona
Promising Female Singer/Performer - Julie Anne San Jose
Most Popular Recording/Performing Group - Parokya ni Edgar
Most Promising Recording/Performing Group - ASAP Boys R Boys
Most Popular Male Novelty Singer - Jose Manalo and Wally Bayola
Most Popular Female Novelty Singer - Anne Curtis (Annebisyosa)

Television category
Prince of Philippine Television - Coco Martin (Minsan Lang Kita Iibigin - ABS-CBN)
Princess of Philippine Television - Kim Chiu (My Binondo Girl - ABS-CBN)
Most Popular Loveteam in Movies and Television - Enchong Dee and Erich Gonzales (ABS-CBN)
Most Promising Loveteam for Movies and TV - Bea Binene and Jake Vargas (GMA-7) 
Most Popular Male Child Performer - Bugoy Cariño (100 Days to Heaven - ABS-CBN)
Most Popular Female Child Performer - Xyriel Manabat (100 Days to Heaven - ABS-CBN)
Most Popular TV Program News & Public Affairs - 24 Oras (GMA-7)
Most Popular TV Program Drama Series - 100 Days to Heaven (ABS-CBN)
Most Popular TV Program Musical Variety - Eat Bulaga! (GMA-7)
Most Popular TV Program Talent Search/Reality - Talentadong Pinoy (TV5)

Special awards
Bert Marcelo Lifetime Achievement Award - Jose Manalo and Wally Bayola
Comedy Actor of the Year - John Lapus
Comedy Actress of the Year - Eugene Domingo
Outstanding Government Service Award - Laguna Governor ER Ejercito
Global Achievement by a Filipino Artist - Apl De Ap

Multiple awards

Individuals with multiple awards 
The following individual names received two or more awards:

*Note: Special Award winners are not included.

Companies with multiple awards 
The following companies received two or more awards in the television category:

References

Box Office Entertainment Awards
2012 film awards
2012 television awards
2012 music awards